Below are the units and commanders that participated in the Battle of Wuhan, also called the Wuchang–Hankou campaign, fought from early June through November 12, 1938, a phase of the Second Sino-Japanese War.

Japan

Ground forces 

Imperial Japanese Army (mid-July 1938)

Central China Expeditionary Force 
General Shunroku Hata
 15th Division - Lt. Gen. Yoshio Iwamatsu   
 15th Infantry Brigade Group 
 51st Infantry Regiment
 60th Infantry Regiment
 67th Infantry Regiment
 1 tankette company
 15th Division Reconnaissance Company 
 21st Field Artillery Regiment
 15th Military Engineer Regiment
 15th Transport Regiment
 17th Division- Lt. Gen. Takichi Kouya   
 17th Infantry Brigade Group 
 53rd Infantry Regiment 
 54th Infantry Regiment 
 81st Infantry Regiment 
 23rd Field Artillery Regiment
 7th Military Engineer Regiment
 17th Transport Regiment
 18th Division - Lt. Gen. Seiichi Kunou 
 23rd Infantry Brigade
 55th Infantry Regiment
 56th Infantry Regiment
 35th Infantry Brigade
 114th Infantry Regiment
 124th Infantry Regiment
 18th Mountain Artillery Regiment
 22nd Cavalry Battalion
 12th Engineer Regiment
 12th Transport Regiment
 22nd Division - Lt. Gen. Ichiji Dobashi  
 22nd Infantry Brigade Group 
 22nd Infantry Regiment
 84th Infantry Regiment
 86th Infantry Regiment
 22nd Recon troops
 52nd Mountain Artillery Regiment
 22nd Engineer Regiment
 22nd Transport Regiment
 116th Division - Lt. Gen. Yoshishige Shimizu  
 119th Infantry Brigade
 109th Infantry Regiment
 120th Infantry Regiment
 130th Infantry Brigade
 133rd Infantry Regiment
 138th Infantry Regiment
 122nd Field Artillery Regiment
 120th Cavalry Battalion?
 116th Engineer Regiment
 116th Transport Regiment
 1st Independent Machinegun Battalion
 7th Independent Machinegun Battalion
 8th  Independent Machinegun Battalion
 6th Independent Light Armored Car Battalion 
 8th Independent Light Armored Car Battalion 
 9th Independent Light Armored Car Battalion 
 5th Tank Regiment
 7th Tank Regiment
 2nd Independent Mountain Artillery Regiment
 3rd Independent Mountain Artillery Regiment
 10th Field Heavy Artillery Regiment
 5th Field Heavy Artillery Brigade 
 11th Field Heavy Artillery Regiment
 12th Field Heavy Artillery Regiment-
 6th Field Heavy Artillery Brigade
 13th Field Heavy Artillery Regiment
 14th Field Heavy Artillery
 1st Mortar Battalion
 4th Mortar Battalion 
 1st Independent Military Engineer Regiment
 2nd Independent Military Engineer Regiment
 8th, Independent Military Engineer Regiment
 12th Independent Military Engineer Regiment 
 Guard Division 
 4th Field Anti-aircraft gun Company
 5th Field Anti-aircraft gun Company
 7th Field Anti-aircraft gun Company
 16th Division 
 5th Field Anti-aircraft gun Company
 6th Field Anti-aircraft gun Company
 River transport unit - Maj. Gen. Katamura Shihachi
 Jiujiang Anti-aircraft gun Company
 Army Labor troops (3rd Independent Military Engineer Regiment)
 Army Railroad Unit - Maj. Ochiai Shoji

Eleventh Army 
General Neiji Okamura 
 6th Division
 Lt. General Shiro Inaba 
 9th Infantry Brigade
 11th Infantry Regiment
 41st Infantry Regiment
 21st Infantry Brigade
 21st Infantry Regiment
 42nd Infantry Regiment
 5th Mountain Artillery Regiment
 5th Cavalry Regiment
 5th Engineer Regiment
 5th Transport Regiment
 9th Division
 Lt. General Ryousuke Yoshizumi 
 6th Infantry Brigade
 7th Infantry Regiment
 35th Infantry Regiment
 18th Infantry Brigade				
 19th Infantry Regiment
 36th Infantry Regiment
 9th Mountain Artillery Regiment
 9th Cavalry Regiment
 9th Engineer Regiment
 9th Transport Regiment
 27th Division
 Lt. General Masaharu Homma [Joined 11th army July 15, 1938]
 1st China Garrison Infantry Regiment 
 2nd China Garrison Infantry Regiment
 3rd China Garrison Infantry Regiment
 27th Division reconnaissance troops 
 27th Mountain Artillery Regiment 
 27th Military Engineer Regiment 
 27th Transport Regiment 
 101st Division
 Lt. Gen. Masaki Ito or Lt. Gen. Masatoshi Saito
 101st Infantry Brigade
 101st Infantry Regiment
 149th Infantry Regiment
 102nd Infantry Brigade
 103rd Infantry Regiment
 157th Infantry Regiment
 101st Field Artillery Regiment
 101st Cavalry Regiment
 101st Engineer Regiment
 101st Transport Regiment
 106th Division
 Lt. Gen. Atsuo Matsuura 
 111th Infantry Brigade
 113th Infantry Regiment
 147th Infantry Regiment
 136th Infantry Brigade
 125th Infantry Regiment
 145th Infantry Regiment
 106th Field Artillery Regiment
 106th Cavalry Regiment
 106th Engineer Regiment
 106th Transport Regiment
 Formosa Infantry Brigade
 Maj. Gen. Senshuu Shigetou, [operating with China Area fleet] 
 1st Formosa Infantry Regiment
 2nd Formosa Infantry Regiment 
 Formosa artillery battalion 
 Formosa engineer battalion 
 Formosa transport regiment

Second Army 
Prince Naruhiko
 3rd Division  - Lt. Gen. Susumu Fujita   
 5th Infantry Brigade
 6th Infantry Regiment
 68th Infantry Regiment
 29th Infantry Brigade
 18th Infantry Regiment
 34th Infantry Regiment
 3rd Field Artillery Regiment
 3rd Cavalry Regiment
 3rd Engineer Regiment
 3rd Transport Regiment
 10th Division – Lt. Gen. Yoshio Shinozuka
 8th Infantry Brigade
 39th Infantry Regiment
 40th Infantry Regiment
 33rd Infantry Brigade
 10th Infantry Regiment
 63rd Infantry Regiment
 10th Field Artillery Regiment
 10th Cavalry Regiment
 10th Engineer Regiment
 10th Transport Regiment
 13th Division - Lt. Gen. Ryuhei Ogisu 
 26th Infantry Brigade
 58th Infantry Regiment
 116th Infantry Regiment
 103rd Infantry Brigade
 65th Infantry Regiment
 104th Infantry Regiment
 19th Mountain Artillery Regiment
 17th Cavalry Regiment
 13th Engineer Regiment
 13th Transport Regiment
 16th Division – Lt. Gen. Keisuke Fujie, Gen. Kesao Nakashima, with 2nd Army  to July 4]
 19th Infantry Brigade
 9th Infantry Regiment
 20th Infantry Regiment
 30th Infantry Brigade
 33rd Infantry Regiment
 38th Infantry Regiment
 22nd Field Artillery Regiment
 20th Cavalry Regiment
 16th Engineer Regiment
 16th Transport Regiment

Naval forces 
One hundred vessels, including over 30 naval craft armed with medium-caliber artillery, were gathered. The landing force for Anqing was composed of one infantry brigade, a marine landing battalion, artillery, engineers and chemical elements, totaling about 12,000 men and 80 to 90 guns. The squadron comprised 40 units, including destroyers, minesweepers, naval and river gunboats and blockade boats. Twenty steamboats transported the troops designated to make the landing.

3rd Fleet and China Area Fleet - Adm. Oiakwa Koshiro 
 China Area fleet: - Vice Adm. Kiyoshi Hasegawa
 Izumo (F) (Izumo class armoured cruiser)
 4-20.3 cm gun (2x2), 14-15.2 cm QF gun (1x14), 12-12pdr QF gun (1x12),8-2.5pdr QF gun (1x8), 4–45 cm TT
 Iwate (Izumo class armoured cruiser) 
4-20.3 cm gun (2x2), 14-15.2 cm QF gun (1x14), 12-12pdr QF gun (1x12),8-2.5pdr QF gun (1x8), 4–45 cm TT
One of these cruisers was detached to Yosuko Force to bombard Matang, both to bombard Matou.

 11th Sentai (gunboat flotilla) - Rear Adm. Eijiro Kondo 12/37-12/38
 flagship  Ataka (Gunboat)
 2–12 cm/45cal gun, 2–8 cm/40cal gun, 6 MGs. (1933 May 20, Ataka was incorporated into the 11th squadron as its flagship.)
 Kuri (2nd Class Destroyer) 3 x 12 cm/45cal gun, 2 x 7.7 mm MGs, 4 x 53 cm TT (2x2) 
 Tsuga (2nd Class Destroyer) 3–12 cm/45cal gun, 2-7.7 mm MGs, 4–53 cm TT (2x2)
 Hasu (2nd Class Destroyer) 3–12 cm/45cal gun, 2-7.7 mm MGs, 4–53 cm TT (2x2
 Yaeyama (minelayer) 2–12 cm/45cal gun, 2 MGs, 185 mines (maybe with 12th Sentai?)
 Hozu (Gunboat) 2–8 cm/40cal gun, 3 or 6–13 mm MG
 Katada (Gunboat) 2–8 cm/40cal gun, 3 or 6–13 mm MG
 Atami (Gunboat) 1–8 cm/28cal gun, 6 MGs
 Seta (Gunboat) 2–8 cm/40cal gun, 3 or 6–13 mm MG
 Toba (Gunboat) 2–8 cm/28cal gun, 6 MGs
 Hira (Gunboat) 2–8 cm/40cal gun, 3 or 6–13 mm MG
 Futami (Gunboat) 1–8 cm/28cal gun, 6 MGs
 Sumida (Gunboat) 2–47 mm/40cal gun, 4 MGs
 Kotaka (Gunboat) 5 MGs
 Saga (Gunboat) 1–12 cm/45cal gun, 3–8 cm/40cal gun, 3 MGs. (Saga was incorporated into the 3rd fleet 11th squadron on 1937 October 20.)
 1st Sentai
 1st Destroyer Torpedoboat Unit - ?
 Kasasagi, (Otori class torpedo boat) 3–12 cm/45cal gun (1x3), 1–40 mm AA, 3–53 cm TT (1x3)
 Hiyodori, (Otori class torpedo boat) 3–12 cm/45cal gun (1x3), 1–40 mm AA, 3–53 cm TT (1x3)
 Otori, (Otori class torpedo boat) 3–12 cm/45cal gun (1x3), 1–40 mm AA, 3–53 cm TT (1x3)
 Hayabusa) (Otori class torpedo boat) 3–12 cm/45cal gun (1x3), 1–40 mm AA, 3–53 cm TT (1x3)
 11th Torpedoboat Unit	
 Kari (Otori class torpedo boat) 3–12 cm/45cal gun (1x3), 1–40 mm AA, 3–53 cm TT (1x3)
 Sagi (Otori class torpedo boat) 3–12 cm/45cal gun (1x3), 1–40 mm AA, 3–53 cm TT (1x3)
 Hato (Otori class torpedo boat) 3–12 cm/45cal gun (1x3), 1–40 mm AA, 3–53 cm TT (1x3)
 ? Kiji (Otori class torpedo boat) 3–12 cm/45cal gun (1x3), 1–40 mm AA, 3–53 cm TT (1x3)
21st Torpedoboat Unit	
 Chidori (Chidori class torpedo boat) 3–12 cm/45cal gun (1x3), 1-7.7 mm AA, 2–53 cm TT (2x1)
 Manazuru (Chidori class torpedo boat) 3–12 cm/45cal gun (1x3), 1-7.7 mm AA, 2–53 cm TT (2x1)
 Tomozuru (Chidori class torpedo boat) 3–12 cm/45cal gun (1x3), 1-7.7 mm AA, 2–53 cm TT (2x1)
 Hatsukari (Chidori class torpedo boat) 3–12 cm/45cal gun (1x3), 1-7.7 mm AA, 2–53 cm TT (2x1)
 12th Sentai (minelayer) ?
 1st Minesweeper Unit	1awg = Tsubame - Kamone - Sugi maru - Kashiwa maru
 Tsubame (Tsubame class minelayer) 1–8 cm/40cal AA gun, 1-13.2 mm AA, 120 mines
 Kamone (Tsubame class minelayer) 1–8 cm/40cal AA gun, 1-13.2 mm AA, 120 mines
 Yamasemi (torpedo boat) 2–8 cm QF gun, 2–47 mm QF gun, 2–45 cm TT (detached from Torpedoboat Sentai?)
 Sugi maru (Military used merchantmen minesweeper ?)
 Kashiwa maru (Military used merchantmen minesweeper ?)
 2nd Minesweeper Unit	2 awg = Kotaka and Minor/Smaller craft
 Kotaka (Gunboat) 5 MGs (detached from 11th Sentai)
 Daihatsu, Shohatsu and other small craft
#3 Flying Group (Kosen or Koku Sentai), 3rd Fleet.
 Kamikawa Maru (Mobilized Merchantman seaplane tender) 2–15 cm gun, 2–8 cm AA gun, 4–25 mm AA, 2 catapults, 12 or 8 aircraft (E8N)+
 Notoro (seaplane tender) 2–8 cm/40cal AA gun, 8 aircraft (E8N)+
 Kiji (Otori class torpedo boat) 3–12 cm/45cal gun (1x3), 1–40 mm AA, 3–53 cm TT (1x3) (from 11th Torpedoboat Sentai)
 Transport Unit ?
 20 steamboat transports
 Daihatsu, Shohatsu and other small craft
 Special Unit
 Formosa Brigade (see 11th Army above)
 NLF "Okamoto unit" 
 Kure 4th SNLF (after Aug. 1938)
 Kure 5th SNLF
Special Working Unit
 2nd Combined Air Group, 3rd Fleet.
 Sōryū detachment +
 Fighter daitai - 9 Nakajima A4N1s or Mitsubishi A5M
 Bomber daitai - 18 Aichi D1A1
 Attack daitai - 9 Yokosuka B3Y1
Based at Wuhu 6/38, Anqing 6/38 - 11/38) 
In June the Sōryū detachment moved from Nanking to Wuhu in early June and by mid-June to the Anqing base. At this time they flew air defence and ground support sorties.

Land-based Naval Air Force
 12th Kōkūtai +
 Fighter daitai - 27 Mitsubishi A5M
 Bomber daitai - Aichi D1A1
 Attack daitai - Yokosuka B3Y1
A predominantly carrier fighter unit. Based at Anqing (06/38 – autumn/38)
13th Kōkūtai +
 Fighter daitai - 24 Mitsubishi A5M
 Attack daitai - 18 Mitsubishi G3M
Reorganized on 22 March 1938 to a predominantly land attack unit. The fighter daitai was disbanded on 15 November 1938. Based at Shanghai 
 15th Kōkūtai +
 Fighter daitai - 9 Nakajima A4N1 (to 09/38), 9 Mitsubishi A5M (after 09/38)
 Bomber daitai -12 Aichi D1A1
 Attack daitai - 9 Yokosuka B3Y1
Based at Anqing (10/07/38 – 09/38), Kowkong (09/38 – 01/12/38)

Notes on naval forces:
  15th Kōkūtai entered combat on 10 July from Anqing, and they included A5Ms from the aircraft carrier Sōryū, stationed off the coast since April. The several A5Ms located at Anqing had been unable to provide adequate air protection for Japanese forces until the arrival of the 15th Kōkūtai. At this time the 15th Kōkūtai had a nominal strength of one unit of carrier fighters (12 aircraft), one unit of carrier bombers (12 aircraft) and a half unit carrier attack aircraft (six aircraft). Actual strength was nine A4Ns, nine A5Ms, 18 carrier bombers and nine carrier attack aircraft. Primary duties were to cooperate in the army’s Hankou operations and in particular air defense in the areas along the Yangtze River.
  Pictures and drawings of Japanese gunboats (mostly used on Yangtze River) 
  Armament and ship id from http://admiral31.world.coocan.jp/e/index.htm
  There is a listing for a Yamasemi torpedo boat formerly the Chinese torpedo boat
Chi Fu Po renamed Chien Kang was sunk 9/37 and raised by Japan and recommissioned as the Yamasemi the same year armed with 2–8 cm QF gun, 2–47 mm QF gun, 2–45 cm TT
See: http://surfcity.kund.dalnet.se/sino-japanese-1938.htm

Army Air Force 
Over 300 planes were part of the Wuhan operation.

Central China Aviation Army Corps(before Aug.2) - Yoshi Tokugawa,
 Hiko Dai 2 Daitai of Hiko Dai 16 Hiko Rentai
 IJAAF Type 88 reconnaissance aircraft
 Hiko Dai 8 Rinji Daitai - Colonel Sojiro Takeda  :
 Hiko Dai 1 Chutai  -  Kawasaki Ki-10 
 Hiko Dai 2 Chutai -  Kawasaki Ki-10 
(8th Hiko Daitai was split on 31 July to form the 77th Flying Sentai and the 41st Airfield Daitai.  Based at Shanghai (06/38 – 07/38), Nanking (July 1938)
10th Dokuritsu Hiko Chutai
 Kawasaki Ki-10 ( – 07/38)
 Nakajima Ki-27 (07/38 –)
Based at Nanking, Anqing, Jiujiang (03/38 – 10/38), Hankou (10/38 – 12/38) 
 17th Dokuritsu Hiko Chutai
 Reconnaissance squadron
 2nd Hiko Daitai - Maj. Tamiya Teranishi  ::
 1st chutai  -  Kawasaki Ki-10 
 2nd chutai -  Kawasaki Ki-10 
2nd Hiko Daitai Was amalgamated on 1 August 1938 with the 9th I F Chutai to form the 64th Sentai.
9th Dokuritsu Hiko Chutai 
 Capt. Goro Suzuki (06/38 – 01/08/38) - Kawasaki Ki-10
Was amalgamated on 1 August 1938 with the 2nd Hiko Daitai to form the 64th Sentai.
Based at Changte 
18th Dokuritsu Hiko Chutai - Reconnaissance squadron.
Based at Nanching (08/38 – )
 41st Airfield Daitai (08/38 – ?)

On August 2, the supreme headquarters issued an order to reorganize the Central China aviation army corps establishment. In to bring it in line with the North China Front Army Aviation Corps.  Headquarters Nanjing.

Central China Aviation Army Corps(after Aug.2) - Yoshi Tokugawa[1,2,
 77th Hiko Sentai - Col. Sojiro Takeda
 1st chutai  -  Kawasaki Ki-10 
 2nd chutai -  Kawasaki Ki-10 
Based in Anqing (08/38 – 11/38). Was formed from the 8th Daitai on 31 July 1938.
 3rd Air Regiment - Gen. ?
 10th Dokuritsu Hiko Chutai - senior captain
 Kawasaki Ki-10 ( – 07/38)
 Nakajima Ki-27 (07/38 – 06/42)
Based on Nanking, Anqing, Jiujiang (08/38 – 10/38), Hankou (10/38 – 12/38) 
 17th Dokuritsu Hiko Chutai - senior captain - Reconnaissance squadron
Based in Central China ?,  North China? 
 45th Hiko Sentai - Colonel - light bomber unit
Based:  Central China ?,  North China? 
 75th Hiko Sentai - Colonel - Light bomber unit
Based:  Central China ?,  North China? 
 4th Air Regiment - 
 64th Hiko Sentai -  Maj. Tamiya Teranishi :::
 1st chutai  -  Nakajima Ki-27 
 2nd chutai -  Kawasaki Ki-10, Nakajima Ki-27
 3rd chutai -  Kawasaki Ki-10, Nakajima Ki-27
Based: Changte (August 1938), Ertaokou (08/38 – 11/38), Tianhe 	(09/11/38 – 26/07/39) Was formed on 1 August 1938 from the 2nd Hiko Daitai and the 9th I F Chutai.
 60th Hiko Sentai
 Mitsubishi Ki-21
Based:  Central China ?,  North China? 
 98th Hiko Sentai - colonel - Fiat BR.20 Heavy bomber 
Based:  Central China ?,  North China? 
 18th Dokuritsu Hiko Chutai
 Reconnaissance squadron
Based:  Nanching (08/38 – )
 41st Airfield Daitai (08/38 – ?)
Was formed from the 8th Daitai on 31 July 1938
 59th Hiko Sentai 
 1st chutai  -  Nakajima Ki-27 
 2nd chutai -  Nakajima Ki-27
Based:  Anqing (09/38 – 03/11/38), Hankou (03/11/38 – 08/39)

China (early July 1938)

Army

Ninth Army Region 
..... Chen Cheng
 1st Army Group - Hsueh Yueh
 20th Group Army - Shang Zhen
 32nd Army - Shang Zhen (concurrent)
 139th Division - Li Chao-ying
 141st Division - Tang Yung-liang
 142nd Division - Fu Li-ping
 Salt Gabelle Brigade - Chiang Yung-ke
 18th Army - Huang Wei
 11th Division [G] - Peng Shan
 16th Division - Ho Ping
 60th Division - Chen Pei
 9th Group Army - Wu Qiwei
 4th Army - Ou Zhen
 59th Division - Chang Teh-neng
 90th Division - Chen Yung-chi
 8th Army - Li Ye-tung   [at Lanfeng]
 3rd Division [G] - Chao His-tien
 15th Division - Wang Chih-pin
 66th Army - Yeh Chao
 159th Division - Tan Sui
 160th Division - Hua Chen-chung
 29th Corps - Li Han-huen
 64th Army - Li Han-huen
 155th Division - Chen Kung-hsia
 187th Division - Kung Ke-chuan
 9th Reserve Division - Yen-chuan
 70th Army - Li Chueh
  19th Division - Li Chueh
  91st Division - Chan-hai
 6th Reserve Division - Chi Chang-chien
 37th Corps - Wang Ching-chiu
 25th Army - Wang Ching-chiu
 52nd Division - T_? -shan
 109th Division - Liang Hua-sheng
 74th Army - Yu Chi-shih
 51st Division - Wang Yaou-wu
 58th Division - Feng Sheng-fa
 29th Army - Chen An-pao
 40th Division - Li Tien-hsia
 79thDivision - Chan An-pao
 167th Division - Chao Hsia-kuang [formerly part of Matan Fortress defense::]
 Po Yang Lake Garrison - ?
2nd Army Group - Zhang Fakui
 30th Group Army - Wang Lingji
 72nd Army - Yu Chi-shih
 New 13th Division - Liu Juo-pi
 New 14th Division - Fan Nan-hsuen
 78th Army - Chang Tsai
 New 15th Division - Teng Kuo-chang
 New 16th Division - Chen Liang-chi
 3rd Group Army - Sun Tongxuan
 12th Army - Sun Tongxuan
 20th Division - Chang Tse-min
 22nd Division - Shih Tung-jan
 81st Division - Chan Shu-tang
 31st Group Army - Tang Enbo
 13th Army - Chang Chen
 23rd Division - Ouyang Fen
 89th Division [G] - Chang Hsueh-chung
 35th Division - Wang Ching tsai
 98th Army - Chang Kang
 82nd Division - Lo Chi-chiang
 193rd Division - Li Tsung-chien
 195th Division - Liang Kai
 32nd Group Army - Kuan Lin-cheng
 52nd Army - Kuan Lin-cheng
 2nd Division [G] - Chao Kung-wu
 25th Division [G] - Chang Yao-ming
 92nd Army - Li Hsien-chou
 21st Division - Hou Ching-ju
 95th Division - Lo Chi
 Tienpei Fortress Command - Li Yen-nien
 2nd Army - Li yen-nien 
 9th Division [G] - Cheng Tso-min
 57th Division [G] - Shih Chung-cheng
 Tienchiachen Fortress Units
 Tiennan Fortress Command - Kuei-chang
 54th Army - Hou Kuei-chang
 14th Division [G] - Chen Leih
 18th Division - Li Fang-pin
 Wuhan Garrison - Lo Cho-ying
 Yangtse River North Region - Wan Yao-huang
 6th Army - Kan Li-chu
 93rd Division - Kan Li-chu
 16th Army - Tung Chao
 28th Division - Tung Chao 
 Yangtse River South Region - Chou Ai
 75th Army - Chao Ai
 6th Division - Chang Ying [g]
 13th Division - Fang Ching
 Huang Ngo Fortress Units
 Wuhan Garrison Command - Kuo Chan
 94th Army - Kuo Chan
 55th Division - Li Chi-lan
 185th Division - Fang Tien
 37th Army - Huang Kuo-liang
 92nd Division - Huang Kuo-liang
 Hupei Provincial Air Defense Units
 30th Corps - Lu Han
 60th Army - Lu Han
 184th Division - Chang Chung
 49th Division - Li Chi-lan
 102nd Division - Po Hui-chang
 26th Corps - Wan Fu-lin
 53rd Army - Wan Fu-lin 
 130th Division - Chu Huang-hsun
 116th Division - Chou Fu-cheng

Fifth Army Region 
.....Li Tsung-jen, Bai Chongxi (acting)
 3rd Army Group - Sun Lianzhong
 2nd Group Army - Sun Lianzhong
 30th Army - Tien Chen-nan
 30th Division - Chang Ching-lieh
 31st Division - Chih Feng-cheng
 42nd Army - Feng An-pang
 27th Division [G] - Huang Chiao-sung
 44th Sep. Brigade - Wu Peng-chu
 26th Army - Hsiao Chi-chu
 32nd Division - Wang Hsiu-shen
 44th Division - Chen Yung
 55th Army - Tsao Fu-lin
 29th Division - Tsao Fu-lin
 74th Division - Li Han-chang
 87th Army - Liu Yin-ku
 198th Division - Wang Yu-ying
 4th Army Group - Li Pin-hsien
 29th Group Army - Wang Tsan-hau
 4th Army - Peng Chen-fu
 149th Division - Wang Tse-chun
 162nd Division - Chang Chieh-cheng
 67th Army -  Hsu Shao-tsung
 150th Division - Liao Chen
 161st Division - Hsu Shao-tsung
 11th Group Army - Li Pingxian
 84th Army - Chin Lien-fang
 188th Division - Liu Jen
 189th Division - Lin Ya-his
 48th Army - Chang Yi-shun
 172rd Division - Huo Wei-chen
 174th Division - Chang Kuang-Wei
 176th Division - Ou Shou-mien
 68th Army - Liu Ju-ming
 119th Division - Li Chin-tien
 143rd Division - Li Tseng-chih
 86th Army - Ho Chih-chung
 103rd Division - Ho Shao-chou
 121nd Division - Mo Ting-fang 
 26th Group Army - Xu Yuanquan
 10th Army  - Xu Yuanquan
 41st Division - Ting Chih-pan
 48th Division - Hsu Chi-wu
 199th Division - Lo Shu-chia
 21st Group Army - Liao Lei
 31st Army - Wei Yun-sung
 131st Division - Ling Tse-hui
 135th Division - Su Tsu-hsing
 138th Division - Mo Teh-hung
 7th Army - Chang Kan
 171st Division - Chi Tao-cheng
 172nd Division - Cheng Shu-fen
 19th Corps - Feng Chih-an
 77th Army - Feng Chih-an
 37th Division - Chang Ling-yun
 132nd Division - Wang Chang-hai
 51st Army - Yu Hsueh-chung
 113th Division - Chou Kuang-lieh
 114th Division - Mo Chung-heng 
 71st Army - Sung Hsi-lien  =Lanfeng
 61st Division - Chung Sung
 88th Division [G]- Chung Pin
 36th Division [G] - Chiang Fu-sheng
 27th Corps - Chang Tse-chung
 59th Army - Chang Tse-chung
 Cav. Regiment
 38th Division - Huang Wei-kang
 180th Division - Liu Chen-san
 13th Cavalry Brigade - Yao Ching-chuan
 45th Army - Chen Ting-hsun
 125th Division - Wang Shih-chun
 127th Division - Chen Li
 24th Group Army - Han Deqin
 57th Army - Miao Cheng-liu
 111th Division - Chang En-tuo
 112th Division - Huo Shou-wei
 89th Army- Han Deqin
 33rd Division - Chia Yun-shan
 117th Division - Li Shou-wei
 27th Group Army - Yang Sen [defense of Anqing:]
 20th Army - Yang Sen (concurrent)
 133rd Division - Yang Han-yu
 134th Division - Yang Han-chung
 17th Corps - Hu Tsung-nan
 1st Army - Hu Tsung-nan (concurrent) 
 1st Division - Li Cheng-hsien
 78th Division - Li Wen

[G] = German Trained Division

Air Forces  
 4th Pursuit Group (PG) - Mao Ying-Chu
 21st Pursuit Squadron (PS) - Lo Ying-Teh (Polikarpov I-16)
 22nd PS - Zhang Wei-Hua(to 04/07/38), Wang Yuan-Po ( after 04/07/38) (Curtiss Hawk III, Polikarpov I-15bis,  Polikarpov I-16)
 23rd PS - Liu Chung-Wu (Polikarpov I-15bis, Curtiss Hawk III)
 24th PS (Independent) - Liang Yi-Guan (Polikarpov I-16s)
 1st Bomber Group (BG) (Just became operational in spring of 1938)  
 2nd Bomber Squadron (BS) - Sun Tungan (Tupolev SB)
 6th BG(Reorganizing from a bomber to a fighter group)
 34th PS (Henschel Hs-123)
Voluntary Soviet units (Soviet fighter groups varied from two to eight, though for the largest period of time there were five.)
 Machin group - Machin (Tupolev SB)
 Titov group - G. V. Titov (Tupolev SB), Arrived in China in June 1938. 
 Nikolaenko group - E. M. Nikolaenko (Polikarpov I-16)

Naval Forces   
June 1938 between Mantang and Hukou
9 Gunboats: Yi Sheng, Hsien Ning, Chung Ning, Sui Ning, Chung Shan (Capt Sa Shih Chun), Chu Tung, Yung Sheng, Chu Chien, Hu Fu(?)
Unknown number of “high-speed” boats and PT-boats, among them No. 93, Shin No. 223, Yueh No. 253, Wen No. 42, Wen No. 88. These boats were assigned to the Chinese Navy GHQ after the Torpedo School was deactivated on July 9, 1938.
Minelayer(s):  One known; Huying
Naval Gun units at Yangtze Fortress Matang, Hukou, Tienchia and Kotien; see above under Army and below in Notes.
After July 1938 additional craft appear in references at Hankow to await possible evacuation of the National Military Council.
Gunboats: Chu Kuan, Yung Chi, Chiang yuan.
Unknown boat types: Chung  Shan, Chaing Chen, Min Sheng.
In PoYang Lake
9 Gun boats: Yin Ning (Capt Yen Chuan Ching), Hai Ning, and seven others.

Notes
 The Battle of Antsin (Anqing today) Chinese side includes 27th Group Army, commanded by general Yang Sen, and 20th Army (Sichuan provincial army). Defense of Antsin had been entrusted to the Chinese 146th and 147th Divisions.   These were from the Sichuan provincial army, 27th Group Army.  They are omitted from the July oob above because they were defeated in June, probably pulled from the line for refitting.
27th Group Army - Yang Sen, Defended Anqing, Wu-wei,  Takuanin in June 1938
 20th Army - Yang Sen (concurrent)
 133rd Division - Yang Han-yu
 134th Division - Yang Han-chung
 146th Division - ? 
 147th Division - ?
 Matan Fortress Garrison consisted of Naval Fortress troops with twelve 12-cm (4.7 inch) guns, 53rd and 167th Divisions. (53rd Division omitted from the July oob above because they were defeated in June, probably pulled from the line for refitting.)
 Other Fortress Units consisted of Naval Fortress troops six 10.5-cm (4 inch) guns at Hukou, sixteen 10.5-cm (4 inch) guns at Tienchiachen, ten 7.5-cm (3 inch) guns at Huang.
 20 German trained divisions were trained and organized according to plans of the German advisors. They belonged to the first 2 phases of the reorganization of KMT forces. Another 10 divisions (3rd phase) were in training when war broke out.  60 were planned.
 Fully trained: 2nd, 4th, 11th, 10th, 25th, 27th, 57th, 67th, 80th, 83rd, 89th Divisions trained on the German pattern by Chinese officers with 2 German advisors.
 Partially trained: 3rd, 6th, 9th, 14th, 36th, 87th, 88th Divisions, and the Tax Police (die Salz Division) Division had German advisors directly involved in their training.

Footnotes

References 

Second Sino-Japanese War orders of battle